The Secret of NIMH is a 1982 American animated fantasy adventure film directed by Don Bluth in his directorial debut and based on Robert C. O'Brien's 1971 children's novel, Mrs. Frisby and the Rats of NIMH. The film features the voices of Elizabeth Hartman, Peter Strauss, Arthur Malet, Dom DeLuise, John Carradine, Derek Jacobi, Hermione Baddeley, and Paul Shenar. It was produced by Bluth's production company Don Bluth Productions in association with Aurora Productions.

The Secret of NIMH was released in the United States on July 2, 1982, by MGM/UA Entertainment Co. under the United Artists label. It was followed in 1998 by a direct-to-video sequel, The Secret of NIMH 2: Timmy to the Rescue, which was made without Bluth's involvement or input and met with poor reception. In 2015, a live-action/computer-animated remake was reported to be in the works. A television series adaptation is also in development by the Fox Corporation.

Plot 
Mrs. Brisby, a widowed field mouse, lives in a cinder block with her children on the Fitzgibbons' farm. Brisby longs to move her family out of the field as plowing time approaches but her son Timothy has fallen ill. 

Brisby visits Mr. Ages, a friend of her late husband, Jonathan. Ages diagnoses the illness as pneumonia, provides Brisby with medicine, and warns her that Timothy must stay inside for at least three weeks or he could die. On her way home, Brisby befriends Jeremy, a clumsy but friendly crow. They both narrowly escape from the Fitzgibbons' cat, Dragon. The next morning, Brisby discovers that Farmer Fitzgibbons has started plowing early. Although her neighbor Auntie Shrew helps her disable his tractor, Brisby knows she must devise another plan. Jeremy takes her to meet the Great Owl, who tells her to visit a colony of rats that live beneath a rose bush on the farm and ask for the services of Nicodemus, their wise and mystical leader.

Brisby enters the rose bush and encounters an aggressive guard rat named Brutus, who chases her away. She is led back in by Ages, and is amazed to see the rats' use of electricity and other technology. Brisby meets Justin, the friendly captain of the guard; Jenner, a ruthless and power-hungry rat opposed to Nicodemus; and finally Nicodemus himself. From Nicodemus, she learns that many years ago the rats, along with her husband and Ages, were part of a series of experiments at the National Institute of Mental Health (NIMH for short). The experiments boosted their intelligence, enabling them to escape, as well as extending their lifespans and slowing their aging processes. However, they are unable to live as typical rats would, and need human technology to survive, which they have accomplished only by stealing. Nicodemus has authorized a plan for the rats to leave the farm and live independently in an area they refer to as Thorn Valley.

Nicodemus gives Brisby a magical amulet that will activate when the wearer is courageous. Because of the rats' relationship with Jonathan, they agree to help her move her home. First, they need to drug Dragon so that it can be done safely. Only Brisby can do this, as the rats cannot fit through the hole leading into the house; Jonathan was killed by Dragon in a previous attempt, while Ages broke his leg in another. That night, she puts the drug into Dragon's dish, but the Fitzgibbons' son, Billy, catches her. While trapped in a birdcage, she overhears a telephone conversation between Farmer Fitzgibbons and the staff of NIMH and learns that the institute intends to exterminate the rats in the morning. Brisby then escapes from the cage and runs off to warn them.

As a rainstorm approaches, the rats begin moving the Brisby home, with the children and Auntie Shrew inside, using a rope and pulley system. Jenner, who wishes for the rats to remain in the rose bush, sabotages the assembly with his reluctant accomplice Sullivan, causing it to fall apart and crush Nicodemus to death. Brisby soon arrives to warn the rats about NIMH's arrival, but Jenner attacks her and attempts to steal the amulet. Sullivan alerts Justin, who comes to Brisby's aid. Jenner mortally wounds Sullivan but is injured by Justin in a sword fight. As Jenner attempts to attack Justin from behind, the dying Sullivan throws a dagger into his back, killing him. The Brisby home begins to sink into a mud puddle and Brisby and the rats are unable to raise it. Brisby's will to save her family gives power to the amulet, which she uses to lift the house and move it to safety. The next morning, the rats, with Justin as their new leader, have departed for Thorn Valley as Timothy begins to recover. Jeremy soon meets Miss Right, another crow who is just as clumsy as he is, and they fall in love.

Voice cast

Production

Background 
The film rights to the book Mrs. Frisby and the Rats of NIMH had reportedly been offered to Walt Disney Productions in 1972, but they were turned down.

The Secret of NIMH was the first feature film to be directed by Don Bluth. On September 13, 1979, Bluth, fellow animators Gary Goldman and John Pomeroy and eight other animation staff left the feature animation department at Disney to set up their own independent studio, Don Bluth Productions. The studio worked, at first, out of Bluth's house and garage, but moved to a two-story,  facility in Studio City, California, several months later. While they were still working at Disney, they produced the 27-minute short film Banjo the Woodpile Cat as a side project to gain other production skills that the company and their animation program were not addressing. Bluth asked Ron W. Miller, Walt Disney's son-in-law and the president and CEO of the company at the time, to view Banjo, but Miller declined. As Goldman recalled, "that pulled the enthusiasm rug out from under us. We had hoped that the studio might like what we were doing and agree to buy the film and allow us to finish the short film in the studio, which would allow us to recoup what we had spent in terms of money and the many hours that we and the other members of the team had invested in the film".

Before they started making Banjo, artist and story writer Ken Anderson had been getting into Mrs. Frisby and the Rats of NIMH, which he called "a wonderful story". He gave the book to Bluth for him to read and make a film out of after Bluth finished the animation direction of Pete's Dragon. Bluth later showed NIMH to Disney animation director Wolfgang Reitherman, who turned down Bluth's offers to make a movie based on the book: "We've already got a mouse [named Mickey Mouse] and we've done a mouse movie [called The Rescuers]". However, Bluth also presented the novel to the other staff that would work for Don Bluth Productions later on and they all loved it. Two months later, former Disney executive James L. Stewart, who now had started Aurora Productions, called Goldman and told him about Anderson's idea of making a film based on NIMH. At Bluth, Goldman and Pomeroy's request, Aurora Productions acquired the film rights and offered Don Bluth Productions a budget of US$5.7 million and 30 months to complete the film, tighter in both budget and schedule than most Disney animated features at the time.

Writing 

One of the earliest drafts of the film was written by Steven Barnes, who received a creative consultant credit in the final product and was closer to the original novel. The story would have focused more on the rats and their time at NIMH as it did in the book, which was reduced to a short flashback in later revisions to bring Mrs. Brisby and her plight into the forefront. It also included (from the book) a female rat named Isabella (described as "a young, cute, somewhat motor-mouthed rat with a crush on Justin"), who was ultimately left out and much of her dialogue given to Nicodemus. A revised synopsis dated July 2, 1980 by an unattributed author would take the movie closer to its completed form, which ended with the mysterious disappearance of the rats, leading the characters and audience to wonder if they ever really existed, or were just an elaborate illusion.

Bluth himself would later make several changes to the story, most notably with the addition of mystical elements not present in the original novel. He explained that "regarding magic, we really believe that animation calls for some magic, to give it a special 'fantastic' quality". This was most apparent in the magic amulet given to Mrs. Brisby, which was meant to be a visual representation of her character's internal power, something harder to show on film. The object was also meant to introduce a spiritual aspect to the plot, with the director remarking: "The stone or amulet is just a method of letting the audience know that Mrs. Brisby has found 'Courage of the Heart'. Magic? Maybe. Spiritual? Yes". In the same vein, Nicodemus was made into a wizard to "create more mystery" about himself and the rats' colony. The antagonist Jenner was given much more prominence in the movie, being only mentioned as a traitor who leaves in the book, to "add drama" to the narrative by giving it a more visible enemy. Justin also now succeeds Nicodemus as the leader of the rats to give his character more of an arc and allow him an opportunity to "grow and change". Unlike the original work, Justin does not rescue Mrs. Brisby from the cage at the Fitzgibbons' house and she now helps her children without the rats' assistance by using the amulet, once again giving focus to her personal story. As Bluth put it, "The Secret of NIMH is really a story about Mrs. Brisby and her need to save her children. If the rats save her children, then she hasn't grown in the film".

During the film's production, Aurora contacted Wham-O, the manufacturers of Frisbee flying discs, with concerns about possible trademark infringements if the "Mrs. Frisby" name in O'Brien's original book was used in the movie. Wham-O rejected Aurora's request for waiver to use the same-sounding name to their "Frisbee", in the movie. Aurora informed Bluth & company that Mrs. Frisby's name would have to be altered. By then, the voice work had already been recorded for the film, so the name change to "Mrs. Brisby" necessitated a combination of re-recording some lines and, because John Carradine was unavailable for further recordings, careful sound editing had to be performed, taking the "B" sound of another word from Carradine's recorded lines, and replace the "F" sound with the "B" sound, altering the name from "Frisby" to "Brisby".

Casting 
Goldman described the casting process as "exciting, fun, and sometimes strange". He stated that focusing on the characteristics of each character, the voices and acting abilities were crucial, saying that using voices that added to a movie's texture was part of the team's philosophy in the development of a film. Goldman found the strangest casting decision to be Dom DeLuise for Jeremy the Crow, which Goldman, Bluth, and Pomeroy had considered after they watched the 1978 film The End. Elizabeth Hartman was cast as Mrs. Brisby, with Goldman calling her performance in A Patch of Blue "so believable and sincere that we all felt that she was right for the part". Pomeroy suggested Derek Jacobi, who starred in the 1976 miniseries I, Claudius, to play the part of Nicodemus. Peter Strauss, whom the team previously saw in another miniseries from 1976, Rich Man, Poor Man, was cast as Justin. Paul Shenar was assigned to play Jenner since the staff liked his "dark, powerful voice". Shakespearean actor John Carradine was "perfect for the dark, ominous Great Owl", while Aldo Ray was assigned to voice Jenner's reluctant accomplice Sullivan, whom Goldman said "also had a great distinctive voice".

Animation 

The production of The Secret of NIMH lasted from January 1980 to early June 1982. The studio set out with the explicit goal in mind of returning feature animation to its "golden era", concentrating on strong characters and story and experimenting with unusual and often more labor-intensive animation techniques. Bluth believed older techniques were being abandoned in favor of lower production costs and the only way that animation could survive was to continue traditional production methods. Among the techniques experimented with on The Secret of NIMH were rotoscoping, multiple passes on the camera to achieve transparent shadows, backlit animation (where animated mattes are shot with light shining through color gels to produce glowing areas for artificial light and fire effects) and multiple color palettes for characters to fit in different lighting situations, from daylight, to night, to warm environments, to underwater. Mrs. Brisby had 46 different lighting situations; therefore there were 46 different color palettes, or lists of color, for her. Two modern, computerized versions of the multiplane camera were also manufactured for this production.

To achieve the film's detailed full animation while keeping to the tight budget, the studio strove to keep any waste of time and resources to a minimum. The crew often worked long hours with no immediate financial reward (though they were offered a cut of the film's profits, a practice common for producers, directors and stars of live action films, but never before offered to artists on an animated feature); producer Gary Goldman recalled working 110-hour weeks during the final six months of production. Around 100 in-house staff worked on the film, with the labor-intensive cel painting farmed out to 45 people working from home. Many minor roles, including incidental and crowd voice work, were filled in by the in-house staff. The final cost of the film was $6.385 million. The producers, Bluth, Goldman and Pomeroy and the executive producers at Aurora mortgaged their homes collectively for $700,000 to complete the film, with the understanding that their investment would be the first to be repaid. The film was the sixth animated feature to be presented in the Dolby Stereo sound system.

In animating Justin and Jenner's sword fight, the animators referenced similar sequences in films such as The Adventures of Robin Hood (1938) and The Vikings (1958).

Music

The Secret of NIMH: Original Motion Picture Soundtrack contains songs from the film written by Jerry Goldsmith and performed by the National Philharmonic Orchestra. One song, "Flying Dreams" was vocally performed by Paul Williams and Sally Stevens. It was Goldsmith's first composition for an animated feature, which he admitted was such a departure from his normal work that in the end he approached the project like a live action score, employing the same kind of extended themes and structural development. What made the scoring process hard for Goldsmith was that he had to score scenes that were unfinished: "I was on the phone constantly with them. My dupe [copy of the film] was in black and white, and they'd bring their color copy over so I could see it. They were constantly adding footage, and it was constantly, 'What's going on here?' and 'What's happening here?'"

David M. Horton spent a year on the sound design for the film, which was supervised by Goldman. Goldman found the sound work by Horten his second favorite part of the production process, recalling that some of his "most beautiful efforts" had to make way for the recordings of Goldsmith's music: "I remember hearing David's orchestration of ambient sounds and specific sound effects for the 8-minute tractor sequence without Jerry's music cue. It was amazing. But then, so was Jerry's 8-minute music cue, it remains extremely powerful. We were able to combine a lot of David's sounds, treating them like part of the orchestra. It came out great, but I couldn't help but feel empathy for David".

The album was released on July 2, 1982, on vinyl and a re-released reissue on March 3, 1995, on CD with a rearranged track listing. Intrada Records issued a remastered limited edition album on CD on August 17, 2015, with one previously unreleased cue ("At Your Service", running 3:39) and three demos of "Flying Dreams" (as performed by Sally Stevens, Paul Williams and as a piano duet) totaling 10:09. Varese Sarabande did release the soundtrack on CD prior to the 1995 re-released reissue in 1986 with the artwork as the same as the LP jacket, but with a black background and a different track arrangement. The track listings below is of the re-released reissue of the CD.

Release 
Tim Hildebrandt spent two weeks painting The Secret of NIMH's promotional poster.

The film's distributor, MGM/UA Entertainment Co., barely did any promotion for the film, leading Aurora to finance the advertising campaign themselves. The financiers had expected the film to open in wide release in 1,000 venues, but MGM opted for a limited opening weekend in 100 theaters, with its widest release in only 700. Although in competition with the blockbuster E.T. the Extra-Terrestrial directed by future Bluth partner Steven Spielberg, it performed better in those theaters alone in its opening week than Poltergeist, Rocky III, Firefox, and Star Trek II: The Wrath of Khan. However, as a result of its release and competition with other summer fare, NIMH became only a moderate success, grossing nearly $14.7 million in North America, though it was more successful on home video, cable, and foreign releases, ultimately turning a profit.

Home media 
The Secret of NIMH debuted on Super 8 film and several home video formats in 1983, including VHS, Betamax, CED Videodisc, Video8 and LaserDisc, which were distributed by MGM/UA Home Video in North America and Warner Home Video in Europe, Australia and Japan. A Video 2000 version was also released exclusively in Europe. With a $79 purchase price in the United States, the VHS edition sold approximately 25,000 copies within the first few months.

On September 6, 1990, the film was re-released on both VHS and LaserDisc in a new advertising campaign with lower retail prices. It was this new wide availability on video, as well as broadcasts on cable, that helped NIMH garner a cult following long after its theatrical debut. This was followed by another VHS release under the MGM/UA Family Entertainment label in 1994, along with a Philips CD-i video disc version that same year, which was available exclusively through Warner Home Video worldwide.

The film was released on DVD for the first time on November 17, 1998, which was reprinted numerous times in the ensuing years, both as a stand-alone release or bundled with other animated movies from MGM or 20th Century Fox. Don Bluth and Gary Goldman later oversaw a high-definition restoration of the film, which was released on June 19, 2007 in a 2-disc DVD set called the "Family Fun Edition". Improvements in the transfer over the 1998 DVD include color correction and dirt and dust removal and included special features such as audio commentary from both individuals and an interview featurette. A Blu-ray version was released on March 29, 2011, which retained the special features of the "Family Fun Edition".

Reception

Critical response 
The Secret of NIMH received positive reviews upon its release. It holds an approval rating of 93% on Rotten Tomatoes based on 68 reviews, with an average rating of 7.50/10. The consensus states: "The Secret of NIMH seeks to resurrect the classical style of American animation and succeeds, telling a mature story with rapturous presentation". The film also has a weighted average score of 76 out of 100 on Metacritic based on 15 reviews, which indicates "generally favorable reviews".

Critics Gene Siskel and Roger Ebert gave the movie two positive "yes" votes on a July 15, 1982, episode of their television program Sneak Previews, with Ebert stating "Walt Disney would've liked The Secret of NIMH". In his print review for the Chicago Sun-Times, Ebert gave the film three out of four stars, calling it "an artistic success", praising the quality of its animation and that it "contains that absolute rarity among feature-length animated cartoons, an interesting premise". Despite his praise, Ebert found that NIMH may not resonate as well on an emotional level with younger viewers, since "it has so many characters and involves them in so many different problems that there's nobody for the kids in the audience to strongly identify with". Siskel, writing for the Chicago Tribune, found the movie "charming", but stated that the narrative was "littered with too many unimportant characters" and that Dom DeLuise "insert[ed] too much of himself" into the character of Jeremy. Despite this, Siskel found the film, particularly the second half, to be a "genuine pleasure" and felt that even adults will be drawn into the story by the end, giving it three stars out of four.

Vincent Canby of The New York Times noted the film's animation was "something of a technical and stylistic triumph" in comparison to that of Disney's golden age, but expressed dismay at the narrative, finding it too complicated and lacking in an "easily identifiable central character". In his review for the 1990 VHS re-release, Jeff Unger of Entertainment Weekly gave The Secret of NIMH a grade of "A", calling it "a wonderful adaptation" of the original book, adding that "Bluth and his animators, bless them, chose to revive an endangered art form – classically detailed animation. They drew their characters exquisitely and gave them individual personalities. The entire ensemble – artists, actors, animals, and musicians – created something unique: the world's first enjoyable rat race". Similarly, Richard Corliss of Time magazine called the movie "something gorgeous to look at".

Accolades 
The Secret of NIMH won Best Animated Film of 1982 at the 10th annual Saturn Awards, where it also received a nomination for Best Fantasy Film, losing to The Dark Crystal. In his acceptance speech, Bluth remarked: "Thanks. We didn't think anyone had noticed". The film was also nominated for Best Family Feature for Animation, Musical or Fantasy at the 4th annual Youth in Film Awards, being beaten by E.T. the Extra-Terrestrial, while the home video release received an Award of Excellence from the Film Advisory Board. In 2008, the American Film Institute nominated this film for its Top 10 Animation Films list.

Sequel 

A direct-to-video sequel directed by Dick Sebast and produced by Metro-Goldwyn-Mayer Animation titled The Secret of NIMH 2: Timmy to the Rescue was released on December 22, 1998. Set several years after the events of the first film, the plot focuses on Mrs. Brisby's son Timothy as he struggles to live up to his father's prestigious reputation. Apart from Dom DeLuise and Arthur Malet reprising their roles as Jeremy and Mr. Ages, respectively, none of the original voice cast returned for the film. The movie was made without Don Bluth's input or involvement and was panned by critics and fans upon release.

Live-action remake and television series 
In 2009, Paramount Pictures was working with Neil Burger on a remake of The Secret of NIMH; nothing has materialized since.

In March 2015, MGM re-acquired the rights to produce a new film based on the original novel Mrs. Frisby and the Rats of NIMH. The film is to be produced by the team of Daniel Bobker and Ehren Kruger, with screenplay by Ice Age series writer Michael Berg. It will be James Madigan's directorial debut. It is planned as a CGI/live-action hybrid in the style of films like The Smurfs and Alvin and the Chipmunks, and will be "an origin story in which an imperiled mouse protagonist befriends a comical crew of lab rats as they turn hyper-intelligent. They escape a secret laboratory and become the great minds of vermin civilization, forced to outwit the humans hot on their tails". The studio plans to turn the novel into a family franchise.

The Russo Brothers were announced to be executive producers of the remake as of April 2019.

A television series based on the books was in development at Fox as an event series in September 2021.

Notes

References

Bibliography

External links 

 
 
 
 
 
 The Secret of NIMH at Don Markstein's Toonopedia. Archived from the original on May 19, 2017.

1982 films
1982 animated films
1982 directorial debut films
1980s American animated films
1982 drama films
1980s fantasy adventure films
1982 independent films
American children's animated adventure films
American children's animated drama films
American dark fantasy films
American fantasy adventure films
American independent films
Animated films about animals
Animated films about rats
Animated films based on children's books
Animated films based on novels
1980s English-language films
Films scored by Jerry Goldsmith
Films directed by Don Bluth
Animated films about mice
Films produced by Don Bluth and Gary Goldman
Films produced by John Pomeroy
Films with screenplays by Don Bluth
Films with screenplays by Gary Goldman
Films with screenplays by John Pomeroy
Films with screenplays by Will Finn
Rotoscoped films
Aurora Productions films
Sullivan Bluth Studios films
United Artists films
United Artists animated films
Metro-Goldwyn-Mayer animated films
Metro-Goldwyn-Mayer films
Rats of NIMH
1980s children's animated films
Films about animal testing